International Studies Charter High School (ISCHS) is a high school formed by the Spanish, Italian, and French Embassies in association with Miami-Dade County Public Schools. It is located on historic Calle Ocho. It is operated by education management organization Academica.

Class size varies from ten to twenty-five.  Students may choose the Italian, Spanish, or French studies program. The school also offers Italian and Spanish Advanced Placement programs.

The ISCHS student body includes students from Venezuela, Spain, France, Portugal, Colombia, Switzerland, Cuba, Lebanon, Mexico, Italy, Ecuador, Bolivia, Argentina, Nicaragua, Honduras, Brazil, China, and more.

See also
 American School of Paris - an American international school in France

References

High schools in Miami-Dade County, Florida
Public high schools in Florida
Public middle schools in Florida
Charter schools in Florida
Miami-Dade County Public Schools
International schools in Florida
French international schools in the United States
2004 establishments in Florida
Educational institutions established in 2004